Thug life may refer to:

Thug Life, a hip hop group including Tupac Shakur
Thug Life, Volume I, the only album released by Thug Life
Tupac: A Thug Life, a book about Shakur
"The Hate U Give Little Infants Fucks Everybody", an acronym devised by Shakur
The Hate U Give, a young adult novel by Angie Thomas
The Hate U Give (film), a 2018 crime film based on the novel
"Thug Life", a song from the album Iridescence by Brockhampton
"Thug Life", a song from the album Issa Album by 21 Savage
"Thug Life", a song from the album Pray 4 Love by Rod Wave
Thug Law: Thug Life Outlawz Chapter 1, a compilation album by Big Syke
Thug Life (film), a 2001 film directed by Greg Carter
Thug life (concept), in gangsta rap music